Soul Groove is an album by saxophonist Johnny Griffin and trombonist Matthew Gee recorded in 1963 and released on the Atlantic label.

Reception
The Allmusic site awarded the album 3 stars stating "The music seldom reaches ignition point on this undistinguished 1965 session... Soul Groove disappoints in several areas, including the writing that seldom surpasses head-arrangement status...  The co-leaders' contributions also pass in a blur. Tenor and trombone front lines can work, but here the tone of the two instruments is too similar; Griffin and Gee's solos tend to drift and smear over one another".

Track listing 
All compositions by Matthew Gee except as indicated
 "Oh Gee" - 2:21     
 "Here" - 5:10     
 "At Sundown" (Lou Donaldson) - 4:51     
 "The Swingers Get the Blues, Too" - 8:00     
 "Twist City" - 5:22     
 "Poor Butterfly" (John Golden, Raymond Hubbell) - 4:59     
 "Mood for Cryin'" (Aaron Bell) - 4:42     
 "Renee" - 5:18

Personnel 
 Johnny Griffin - tenor saxophone
 Matthew Gee - trombone
 "Big" John Patton - organ (tracks 1, 5 & 8)
 Hank Jones - piano, organ (tracks 2-4, 6 & 7)
 Aaron Bell - bass, tuba
 Art Taylor - drums
 Carlos "Patato" Valdes - congas, bongos

References 

Matthew Gee albums
Johnny Griffin albums
1964 albums
Atlantic Records albums